Gold Hill may refer to:

Canada 
 Gold Hill, British Columbia

United Kingdom 
 Gold Hill, Shaftesbury, Dorset, a steep street used in Hovis commercial

United States 
Alabama
 Gold Hill, Alabama

California
 Gold Hill, El Dorado County, California, an unincorporated community
 Gold Hill, Nevada County, California, a former settlement
 Gold Hill, Placer County, California, an unincorporated community
 Gold Hill (Nevada County, California), a hill

Colorado
 Gold Hill, Colorado

Montana
 Gold Hill in Fergus County, Montana
 Gold Hill in Lincoln County, Montana
 Gold Hill in Silver Bow County, Montana
 Gold Hill in Sweet Grass County, Montana

Nevada
 Gold Hill, Nevada, an abandoned mining complex

North Carolina
 Gold Hill, North Carolina

Oregon
 Gold Hill, Oregon

Utah
 Gold Hill, Utah, a former mining complex

Virginia
 Gold Hill, Virginia

See also
 Gold Hill Township (disambiguation)